Kevin Hall could refer to: 

Kevin Hall (footballer) (born 1944), Australian footballer
Kevin Peter Hall (1955-1991), American actor
Kevin Hall (sailor), American Olympic athlete